Guillaume Grandidier (1 July 1873 – 13 September 1957) was a French geographer, ethnologist, and zoologist who studied the island of Madagascar.

He was the son of the wealthy industrialist Alfred Grandidier also a zoologist and expert on Madagascar. Guillaume Grandidier was Secretary of the Geographical Society of Paris and a prolific author.

The Atlas des Colonies Françaises, Protectorats et Territoires sous Mandat de la France, simply known as the Atlas Grandidier, was published under his direction in 1934. Among his other works was the monumental Madagascar L'Histoire politique, physique et naturelle de Madagascar. This work was undertaken in cooperation with his father and others such as Alphonse Milne-Edwards and Leon Vaillant. This work ran to 40 volumes.

Liopholidophis grandidieri, a species of snake endemic to Madagascar, was named in his honor by French herpetologist François Mocquard.

References

Further reading 
Helgen KM. 2002. "Guillaume Grandidier's mammal collections from Madagascar". Mammalian Biology  67 (6): 378-380.

External links 
Madagascar Library Listings

French geographers
French ethnologists
French zoologists
Scientists from Paris
1957 deaths
1873 births